The Saudi Falcons ( Aṣ-Ṣuqūr as-Suʿūdīyah) are a BAE Hawk-equipped Royal Saudi Air Force aerobatic team.

History 

On June 6, 1998, at King Abdulaziz Air Base (Dhahran), No. 88 Squadron was created by Gen. Abdulaziz Henaidy, the Royal Saudi Air Force's chief of staff, who is backed by Prince Sultan Bin Abdulaziz (Minister of Defense and Aviation). The squadron is known as the "Saudi Falcons Aerobatic Team." Flying BAE Hawk Mk.65 and 65A jet trainers, it is the Royal Saudi Air Force's (RSAF) official demonstration team.

The Falcons debuted in January 1999 at Riyadh, the Saudi kingdom's capital, as part of Saudi Arabia's 100th anniversary celebrations. Six smoke-capable BAE Hawk Mk.65A and three Mk.65s-all modified by BAE Systems are assigned to the team and now wear the team's striking green and white demonstration colors. In February 2000, the Falcons first appeared outside their homeland - in Bahrain, flying out of Dhahran. Soon afterward, the team and the various RSAF Hawk squadrons moved to King Faisal Airbase (Tabuk) in northwestern Saudi Arabia.

The team draws comparison with the RAF Red Arrows due to the similar aircraft. There are tangible links as ex-Red Arrows personnel have been involved in training the team.

From June 2002, the team toured the kingdom for four months and performed at civil and military shows. The team performed its first ever display in Europe at the Air Power 2011 in Zeltweg.

In July 2011, they displayed in the UK for the first time. The display was cancelled on the first day of the Royal International Air Tattoo at RAF Fairford due to bad weather, but they flew a rolling display the following day.

In June 2014, they displayed in the Kavala AirSea Show which was held in Kavala, Greece.

On 6 September 2015, they displayed in front of 450,000 spectators at the airshow dedicated to the 55th anniversary of the Frecce Tricolori display team at Rivolto Air Base, Italy.

In January 2018, they displayed in the Kuwait Air Show, Kuwait.

See also 

 List of military installations in Saudi Arabia

References

External links 

Royal Saudi Air Force aircraft squadrons
Aerobatic teams